Richard Risby, O.F.M., (1489 - 20 April 1534) was an English Catholic Franciscan friar who was executed for treason during the reign of King Henry VIII.

Life
Risby was born in the parish of St. Lawrence, Reading, in 1489, and entered Winchester College in 1500. He was subsequently a fellow of New College, Oxford, taking his degree in 1510. He resigned in 1513 to enter the Franciscan Order, and eventually became guardian of the Observant friary at Canterbury.

Risby became a supporter of Dame Elizabeth Barton, O.S.B., widely known as the "Holy Maid of Kent", who had the reputation of being a visionary. When she declared that King Henry would soon die if he continued his actions against the papacy, a prophecy that failed to come to pass within the time she predicted, the king turned against her and she was condemned to death by an Act of Attainder (25 Henry VIII, c. 12), together with several of her supporters: Hugh Rich, O.F.M., guardian of the Observant friary at Richmond, Edward Bocking and John Dering, B.D. (Oxon.), both Benedictine monks of Christ Church, Canterbury, Henry Gold, M.A. (St. John's College, Cambridge), Parson of St. Mary Aldermanbury, London, and Vicar of Hayes, Middlesex, and Richard Master, M.A. (King's College, Oxon), Rector of Aldington, Kent, who was pardoned; but by some oversight Master's name was included and Risby's omitted in the catalogue of praetermissi.

Friar Thomas Bourchier, who took the Franciscan habit at Greenwich about 1557, wrote a work chronicling the lives of the Observant friars who were executed under the Tudors, In it he wrote that Risby and Rich had been offered their freedom twice, if they would accept the king's supremacy. Risby was executed by hanging along with the others, including Barton, at Tyburn, London, on 20 April 1534.

References

Cites:
Gairdner, Letters and Papers of the reign of Henry VIII, VI, VII (London, Oxford, Cambridge, Edinburgh, and Dublin, 1882–3), passim;
Francis Aidan Gasquet, Henry VIII and the English Monasteries (London, 1906), 44;
Kirby, Winchester Scholars (London and Winchester, 1888), 98;
Boase, Register of the University of Oxford (Oxford, 1885), 71.

1489 births
1534 deaths
People from Reading, Berkshire
People educated at Winchester College
Fellows of New College, Oxford
English Friars Minor
15th-century English people
16th-century English Roman Catholic priests
16th-century English clergy
Executed Roman Catholic priests
People executed under Henry VIII
People executed under the Tudors for treason against England
Executed people from Berkshire